John Whitfield J Carswell (1887 - date of death unknown), was a Scottish international lawn bowler.

Bowls career
He won a bronze medal in the pairs at the 1954 British Empire and Commonwealth Games in Vancouver, with George Budge.

Personal life
He was a grain merchant by trade and was born and lived in Dalbeattie.

References

1887 births
Date of death unknown
Bowls players at the 1954 British Empire and Commonwealth Games
Commonwealth Games medallists in lawn bowls
Commonwealth Games bronze medallists for Scotland
Scottish male bowls players
Medallists at the 1954 British Empire and Commonwealth Games